The Golden Ocean is a historical novel written by Patrick O'Brian, first published in 1956. It tells the story of a novice midshipman, Peter Palafox, who joins George Anson's voyage around the world beginning in 1740. The story is written much in the language and spelling of the mid-18th century. Palafox is a Protestant Irish boy from the west coast of Ireland, schooled by his father, a churchman, and eager to join the Royal Navy. He learns naval discipline and how to determine his ship's position at sea as part of a large berth of midshipmen on HMS Centurion. His friend Sean O'Mara joins with him, considered his servant initially by officers and put among the seamen, rising in rank as he shows his abilities, to bosun's mate.

The book contains a wealth of period detail, and includes historical figures, like Anson, the midshipman Keppel, Mr Walter, the chaplain to Anson and kind guide and keeper of the purse for Peter Palafox, and captains of other vessels in the squadron.

Reviews in 1994 found it not a mature work from the author, but showing signs of "the Conradian force that shows where O'Brian was headed as a narrative writer." Another reviewer felt this novel showed nearly "all the naval lore and sense of place that grace the Aubrey/Maturin books". It was aimed at younger readers, but two reviewers felt that all readers "will be swept up by the richness of O'Brian's prodigious imagination", and it was "A humorous adventure for all collections."

Plot summary

In spring 1740, Peter Palafox, his friend Sean O'Mara and Sean's uncle Liam are riding from Connaught to Cork so that Peter can join the Royal Navy as a midshipman. Sean decides to join, too, so Liam will take the horses back home. They meet Peregrine FitzGerald at the market fair, another boy heading for HMS Centurion. Both lose their money. FitzGerald meets Lord Culmore who loans him ten guineas, solving their money problems. They meet the brig Mary Rose, at Cove of Cork and reach HMS Centurion at Spithead on time. Peter is wearing all his best clothes, including a green stone given to him as a "luck giver". On board Peter learns he must have a sea chest and a uniform. Mr Walter, the chaplain, recognises the emerald pinned to his neck cloth, which can supply all that Peter needs. The emerald from a Spanish ship of the Armada now helps Peter as England fights Spain. Peter likes the ship HMS Centurion, but takes time to be at ease with naval discipline. Peter knows the Irish names for the parts of a ship, but not yet the English names. At dinner with Commodore Anson he meets officers on his ship and others in the squadron. Neighbour to Peter is Captain Callis, a man who loved Peter's mother long ago and lost her to Peter's father. Anson remarks on the terrible decision by the Admiralty to include the Chelsea pensioners (500 infirm sailors) as part of his crew.

Peter tells the chaplain that he knows the ship's destination, to the golden ocean, the Pacific, to fight the Spanish. Anson is disappointed that his secret mission is common knowledge on the Irish coast. Common knowledge also knows that the Spanish have a squadron of the same number of ships, under Pizarro. The true voyage begins, after the squadron escorts merchant ships heading east. Six weeks of contrary winds keep them in the English Channel, long enough for the landsman to be used to the sea. FitzGerald, wounded in his fight with Ransome, is now ready for duty, assigned to a watch. When sent to the topmast, FitzGerald can barely do it. Ransome helps him down, so FitzGerald apologises to him. Peter is at home up on the masts, with no fear of heights or the motion of the ship. At Funchal in Madeira in November, FitzGerald returns to England, carrying a letter from Peter to his father, and many gifts for his siblings. Mr Elliot, midshipman, teaches Peter the trigonometry, by the example of a stick of known height and its shadow, a tree whose shadow is paced out, thus the height of the tree is calculated; Peter understands it and succeeds in his classes on board. Before the equator, Peter gets a delirious fever, lasting until they land at Saint Catherine's island off Brazil, where they stay past Christmas. Many die of tropical diseases. Mr Ransome is friendlier with him, but still calls him Teague, an insulting name for an Irish boy. Rounding Cape Horn is fierce. They meet with high winds, thick fog, bitter cold and storms, naming several rendezvous points in the Pacific. Pearl rejoins after having fallen in with five Spanish ships, the fleet Peter described to Anson. In March 1741, they reach 52 degrees 32 minutes south. Peter is glad for the warm clothes from FitzGerald. None agree on the longitude in waters uncharted by the English. Peter's ribs are broken from a rope that froze in this cold, windy weather; he feels lucky he was not tossed into the sea like so many others. Mr Elliot is taken by the scurvy in April, a sore loss to Peter, just after they lose Pearl and Severn.

Centurion, Gloucester, Wager, Tryal and the pink Anna think they are west enough to turn north. Hopelessness pervades. Commodore Anson appears to be made of "iron and oak", a little more affable the worse the weather gets. Sean is captain of the foretop, as he performs well, being sure-footed and brave with frozen sails and ropes. Centurion reaches Juan Fernandez, staying there a few months to fix ships and heal the men with good food there. Peter spends a second birthday as a midshipman, having learned the tone of authority and grown out of his best clothes. Peter computes the losses of crew on Centurion, Gloucester and Tryal since leaving England: 961 sailed out, 626 dead after reaching Juan Fernandez. Tryal takes a prize, a Spanish merchant ship, which vessel replaces the damaged Tryal. Spanish passengers are well-treated, a wise move. Wager never makes this rendezvous. Reduced squadron sails north, reaching Paita. Centurion and Tryal crews take the town, made easier by the fear of the locals, who flee on seeing them. An Irishman living there tells Peter where the huge merchant treasure is. They take the ship with the merchant treasure, truly great wealth. All the crew become experts on the rules of sharing prizes, happy with the share they will see. They keep sailing north, aiming for the Acapulco Galleon, which sails between Manila and Acapulco with treasure. Missing the galleon, the Commodore sails west to Manila. Storm damaged Gloucester is burned at sea, and her crew taken aboard Centurion, the only ship of the squadron now.

Centurion stops at Tinian Island in September 1742. Peter is carried ashore. His health is improved by the fresh food. Centurion sails to Macau, next to Canton, to refit the ship. Peter spends two years of pay in less than a month. They lose Mr Walter and some officers, who take a merchant ship on the well-travelled route back to England, to report progress and carry mail and gifts home. Refit and rested, Centurion is homeward bound. Commodore Anson, once at sea, informs the crew of 227 that they will try again for the Acapulco Galleon, before she reaches Manila. Sailing east, Centurion waits for the galleon, engaging her in close battle on June 20, 1743, taking her and her cargo of silver and gold. Mr Saumarez sails the prize and both ships stopped in Macau to transfer the treasure to Centurion. Sean is promoted to bosun's mate, guarding the treasure aboard the prize and Centurion for the year's voyage home. Truly homeward bound, they put in at Prince's Island, Cape Town (gaining Dutch seamen), speeding to England through a fog in the Channel where they pass unseen French ships, now at war with England. Peter and Sean are paid their shares of the prizes. All of his family is on the lookout for him, for a joyous reunion after four years away. Peter gives his father the good round sum of 1,000 pounds, which will lift his family from genteel poverty.

Characters

Peter Palafox: Son of the Protestant clergyman and wife née Dillon, he has an appointment letter as midshipman on HMS Centurion under Commodore Anson. He was raised in Ballynasaggart in Connaught on the coast, very poor but well educated by his father, speaking English, Irish, Latin and Greek. His birthday is November 4.
Sean O'Mara: He comes along for the excitement and the glory, son of Peter's nurse. He runs very fast. He is accepted as Peter's servant and put in the crew, where he advances for his good work.
Liam: Uncle to Sean and tenant to Peter's father ("farms my father's glebe"), who rides with them to Cork, and takes the horses home.
Mr Richard Walter: He was in seminary with Peter's father. He secured the appointment for Peter and is Chaplain aboard ship. He is modelled on the real person, Chaplain to Commodore Anson.
Peregrine FitzGerald: He is a boy in powdered red hair with a strong sense of honour and offence. He sails to England with Peter, also to be midshipman on Centurion; he is very sea-sick and slow to take to the discipline. He leaves the ship at Funchal, Madeira to join the merchants of the East India Company. He leaves behind his cold weather clothes, a boon to Peter and Sean.
Lord Culmore: He is a friend to FitzGerald, who loans him 10 guineas after FitzGerald lost his money to gambling and Peter lost his to a thief.
Commodore Anson: He leads the squadron and is captain of HMS Centurion, a strong leader.
Mr Keppel: He is already 5 years at sea, a midshipman since age 10, who appears so very young to Peter, and a character from history who rose high in the navy and in society.
Mr Ransome: He is an older boy in the midshipmen's berth, once in the crew and promoted by Anson. He is tall and strong and at sea since age 8.
Mr Elliot: Midshipman who helps Peter to understand the trigonometry after Funchal. He dies of scurvy while ship goes so slowly around Cape Horn.
Captain Callis: He also courted Peter's mother, asks to be remembered to Peter's parents at dinner aboard Centurion.
Captain Dandy Kidd: The first Captain of HMS Wager, who Peter meets at dinner with the Commodore.
Mr John Byron: Midshipman aboard Wager, who Peter meets at dinner with the Commodore.
Mr Saunders: First lieutenant of the Centurion, who often corrects Peter in his duty. He is later promoted to captain on another ship in the squadron.
Colonel Cratcherode: Head of the land forces for the squadron, who Peter meets at dinner with the Commodore.
Mr Pascoe Thomas: He is schoolmaster for the midshipman, who is long in his position, after 35 years teaching boys at sea.
Mr Blew: Master for the Centurion, who teaches navigation to the midshipmen.
Mr Saumarez: He is a lieutenant aboard HMS Centurion, who holds Mr Saunders place when he is sent to be captain on HMS Tryal. He is based on a real person in the Royal Navy.

Ships
Anson's squadron
 HMS Centurion: fourth-rate ship of 1,005 tons, 60 guns, 400 men and the flagship
 HMS Gloucester: 853 tons, 50 guns, 300 men
 HMS Severn: 853 tons, 50 guns, 300 men
 HMS Pearl: 600 tons, 40 guns, 250 men
 HMS Wager: 599 tons, 24 guns, 120 men
 HMS Tryal: 200 tons, 8 guns, 70 men
 Anna and Industry: two store ships meant to part when the stores could be transferred to the squadron

Spanish
 Manila Galleon Nuestra Señora de la Covadonga: 42 guns, 550 men

Reviews

Reviews collected were written in 1994 when W W Norton republished the 1956 novel, and more than half of the Aubrey-Maturin series novels had been published. Reviewers viewed the novel as it stood and in contrast to the author's later level of accomplishments in that series.

Publishers Weekly, writing in 1994, says this first sea novel by O'Brian "can stand on its own as an entertaining and psychologically astute narrative". They see in this 1956 novel "practically all the naval lore and sense of place that grace the Aubrey/Maturin books". Specifically, "Shipboard life rings true, the story never flags and humor abounds: "Well, he is a wonderful poacher for a Protestant," observes one Anglo-Irishman.

Kirkus Reviews finds this novel "Not a mature piece of work, but appealing enough to satisfy fans of O'Brian's naval sagas."

Tom Clark writing in the Los Angeles Times says that "evidently in keeping with an aim of appealing to a younger audience, the darker aspects of the crew's experience are played down in favor of a robust and exhilarating rendering of the great adventure of it all." It is a first sea novel with a young boy as the main character, but "if there's any character in The Golden Ocean with heavyweight potential, it's the sea itself, whose power as a kind of fate is rendered with the Conradian force that shows where O'Brian was headed as a narrative writer." Clark notes that "At least two of those accounts, those of Anson's chaplain, Richard Walter, and of a young Irish midshipman, John Philips, appear to have supplied O'Brian much of what he needed to paint with charming pictorial realism the life both above and below decks on Anson's flagship Centurion."

Library Journal noted that this book by O'Brian "set the course they [Aubrey-Maturin series] later followed." It is recommended for all ages: "A humorous adventure for all collections."

Scott Veale writing in The New York Times was upbeat about this novel, saying that "As always, the author's erudition and humor are on display, whether he's describing the singing of the masts in the wind, the harrowing seas of Cape Horn or 18th-century superstitions." Veale found the period detail to be "uncompromising", and expected that readers "will be swept up by the richness of O'Brian's prodigious imagination."

Related novels by O'Brian and contrasts to them

The same expedition is described from the perspective of two on one of the ships in the squadron that did not make it around the globe in O'Brian's The Unknown Shore. It focusses on the ship HMS Wager and different main characters, including John Byron, then a midshipman, age 18.

Mr Walter the chaplain wrote his own account of the voyage of Anson, noted by Clark (above) as one of O'Brian's historical sources for this novel and the interactions among the officers and crew. An original copy was at auction in 2009.

In 1969, O'Brian published Master and Commander, the first book in a 20 novel series, known as the Aubrey-Maturin series. It is set in the Napoleonic Wars, begins in 1800, and features a pair of men who become the closest of friends, Captain Jack Aubrey and Stephen Maturin, physician and natural philosopher. In Post Captain, the second novel of the series, Aubrey recalls Anson, and asks Maturin if he has read Anson's book. Maturin has, but finds Anson's journey wasteful, as Anson noted nothing of the natural world that he saw on the journey. Aubrey is impressed that Anson made the journey and succeeded in it. The Royal Navy has changed since Anson's voyage, as have the politics of the world, with the thirteen British colonies in North America now the nation of the United States of America, the War of the Austrian Succession over, including the exit of France from nearly all its North American colonies, the French Revolution in the past, and the Irish Rebellion of 1798 also a past event. The Royal Navy and physicians have learned the need for fresh food and citrus to combat scurvy, a disease which killed so many in Anson's squadron, before this connection was made between scurvy and fresh food. The Napoleonic Wars endured so long, that they make a broad canvas of history against which the author sets the lives of his main characters, still keeping a sharp eye to historical detail and period language, which is a different structure than The Golden Ocean, which tells the tale of one long and daring voyage. In one sense, O'Brian views the long eighteenth century as the setting of his works, putting this novel in the same time period as the later series, while technically happening in two different centuries, the 18th and the 19th. They are both set in the Age of Sail, an even longer period of time than the long eighteenth century.

Allusions to history and real places

The story is based on a real event, George Anson's voyage around the world that began in 1740. Places named in Ireland, England, Madeira, the Pacific coast of South America, Manila, Macau and Canton in China are real, including St. Catherine's Island off Brazil at 24 degrees South latitude, shown on this map.

The Spanish galleon Nuestra Señora de la Covadonga, after the battle, was sold at Macau and the treasure transferred to Centurion, which proceeded to England after a brief rest, arriving there in June 1744.

Narrative point of view

This novel was aimed at younger readers, as well as adults, and takes the viewpoint of a new midshipman joining the Royal Navy on HMS Centurion in 1740 on this voyage. The boy is on the one ship that makes the entire voyage, and he is one of the survivors. Seen by the midshipman Peter Palafox, the sense of the adventure is depicted, as he sees the world and learns the discipline, hardships and rewards of the Royal Navy. The hardships of the voyage are not dismissed, with counts of the deaths from scurvy, whose cure was not yet understood, and the problems of navigation without the precise knowledge of location gained by chronometers to measure longitude, depicted in detail.

Publication history

Rupert Hart-Davis published many of O'Brian's works, including translations (e.g., Papillon and Banco: The Further Advancement of Papillon in 1970 and 1973), The Road to Samarcand, The Golden Ocean, The Unknown Shore and short stories from 1953 to 1974. In 1994, The Golden Ocean was re-issued by HarperCollins in the UK and W W Norton in the US.

References

External links
 Model of HMS Centurion

1956 British novels
Historical novels
Novels by Patrick O'Brian
Novels set in the 1740s
Novels set in the 18th century
Rupert Hart-Davis books